Gajraj Rao is an Indian actor who appears predominantly in Hindi films. He is widely known for his performance in the comedy-drama film Badhaai Ho for which he won the Filmfare Award for Best Supporting Actor.

He debuted in 1994 with a minor role in Shekhar Kapur's Bandit Queen and has since worked in many films and web-series. Rao is known for his leading role in Badhaai Ho and supporting roles in movies like Talvar, Blackmail and web-series like TVF'S F.A.T.H.E.R.S. and Tech Conversations with Dad.

He also directed a number of ad-films with Code Red Films.

Filmography

Films

Web series

Accolades

Notes

References

External links

 
 

1971 births
Living people
Place of birth missing (living people)
Male actors in Hindi cinema
Male web series actors
Filmfare Awards winners
Screen Awards winners